The 1922 United States Senate election in Ohio took place on November 7, 1922. Incumbent Democratic Senator Atlee Pomerene ran for re-election to a third term in office, but was defeated by Republican U.S. Representative Simeon Fess.

General election

Candidates
Simeon Fess, U.S. Representative from Yellow Springs (Republican)
Virginia D. Green (Independent)
Atlee Pomerene, incumbent Senator since 1911 (Democratic)

Results

See also 
 1922 United States Senate elections

References

Ohio
1922
1922 Ohio elections